Shahriar Kamali (born 29 March 1972 in Tehran), known as King Kamali, is a retired IFBB professional bodybuilder.

Biography
Nicknamed "The Persian Pearl" and "The Terminator", Kamali was born in Iran, and now lives in West New York, New Jersey and New City, New York. Kamali has a Bachelor of Science degree in Exercise Physiology from George Mason University The resulting knowledge about human kinesiology and sport nutrition combined with his distinctive posing styles makes Kamali a sought out bodybuilder for seminars and guest appearances. He has been featured in many bodybuilding articles, as well as being on the cover of Muscle Magazine.

Competitive stats
Height: 5 ft 10 in (178 cm)
Contest Weight: 225 lb (102 kg)
Off-Season Weight: 310 lb (141 kg)
Arms: 19 in (48.26 cm)
Waist: 36 in (91.44 cm)
Chest: 50 in (127 cm)
Thighs: 30 in (76.2 cm)

Competitive history
1994 NPC Collegiate Nationals, Light-Heavyweight, 1st and Overall
1996 NPC Nationals, HeavyWeight, 10th tied
1997 NPC Nationals, HeavyWeight, 7th
1998 NPC Nationals, HeavyWeight, 3rd
1999 NPC Nationals, HeavyWeight, 1st
2001 Arnold Classic, 4th
2001 Ironman Pro Invitational, 3rd
2001 Mr. Olympia, 10th
2002 Mr. Olympia, 17th
2002 Show of Strength Pro Championship, 11th
2003 Night of Champions, 14th
2004 Arnold Classic, 8th
2004 Grand Prix Australia, 5th
2005 Arnold Classic, 11th
2005 Ironman Pro Invitational, 5th
2005 San Francisco Pro Invitational, 12th
2006 New York Pro Championships, 16th
2006 Europa Super Show, 11th
2006 Montreal Pro, 14th
2006 Atlantic City Pro, 15th

See also
Arnold Classic
List of male professional bodybuilders

References

Iranian bodybuilders
American bodybuilders
American people of Iranian descent
People from West New York, New Jersey
1972 births
Living people
People from New City, New York
Sportspeople of Iranian descent